The 1884–85 Football Association Challenge Cup was the 14th staging of the FA Cup, England's oldest football tournament. 114 teams entered, 14 more than the previous season, although 8 of these never played a match.

First round

Replays

Second round

Replays

Third round

Replays

Fourth round

Fifth round

The geographical nature of the early rounds left the competition with 9 clubs at this stage, and the Football Association Committee decided to draw two clubs for one fixture in the fifth round in order to "obviate the necessity of further byes".  Following the drawing of Chatham and Old Carthusians, the Committee then drew the sixth round, the winners of the one fifth round tie being drawn to face Church F.C., who had the choice of ground.

Sixth Round

Replay

Semi finals

Replay

Final

References

 FA Cup Results Archive

1884-85
1884–85 in English football
FA Cup